Days and Nights is a 2013 American drama film based on Chekov's The Seagull 

Days and Nights may also refer to:
Days and Nights (1944 film), a Soviet drama film
Days and Nights , a short novel by Konstantin Simonov
Days and Nights, a 1926 work by Nathan Bistritzky
Days + Nights, a 2014 album by Daley

See also
Day & Night (disambiguation)
Nights and Days, a film based on Nights and Days (Noce i dnie) a novel by Maria Dąbrowska